
Gmina Michałowice is a rural gmina (administrative district) in Kraków County, Lesser Poland Voivodeship, in southern Poland.

The gmina contains part of the protected area called Dłubnia Landscape Park.

Villages
Gmina Michałowice contains the villages and settlements of Firlejów, Górna Wieś, Kończyce, Kozierów, Książniczki, Masłomiąca, Michałowice, Młodziejowice, Pielgrzymowice, Prawda, Raciborowice, Sieborowice, Więcławice Dworskie, Wilczkowice, Wola Więcławska, Zagórzyce Dworskie, Zdziesławice and Zerwana.

Neighbouring gminas
Gmina Michałowice is bordered by the city of Kraków and by the gminas of Iwanowice, Kocmyrzów-Luborzyca and Zielonki.

References
 Polish official population figures 2006

Michalowice
Kraków County